Olbers's paradox, also known as the  dark night sky paradox, is an argument in astrophysics and physical cosmology that says that the darkness of the night sky conflicts with the assumption of an infinite and eternal static universe.  In the hypothetical case that the universe is static, homogeneous at a large scale, and populated by an infinite number of stars, any line of sight from Earth must end at the surface of a star and hence the night sky should be completely illuminated and very bright. This contradicts the observed darkness and non-uniformity of the night. 

The darkness of the night sky is one of the pieces of evidence for a dynamic universe, such as the Big Bang model. That model explains the observed non-uniformity of brightness by invoking expansion of the universe, which increases the wavelength of visible light originating from the Big Bang to microwave scale via a process known as redshift. The resulting microwave radiation background has wavelengths much longer (millimeters instead of nanometers), which appears dark to the naked eye and bright for a radio receiver. 

Other explanations for the paradox have been offered, but none have wide acceptance in cosmology.  Although he was not the first to describe it, the paradox is popularly named after the German astronomer Heinrich Wilhelm Olbers (1758–1840).

History 

The first one to address the problem of an infinite number of stars and the resulting heat in the Cosmos was Cosmas Indicopleustes, a 6th-century Greek monk from Alexandria, who states in his Topographia Christiana: "The crystal-made sky sustains the heat of the Sun, the moon, and the infinite number of stars; otherwise, it would have been full of fire, and it could melt or set on fire."

Edward Robert Harrison's Darkness at Night: A Riddle of the Universe (1987) gives an account of the dark night sky paradox, seen as a problem in the history of science. According to Harrison, the first to conceive of anything like the paradox was Thomas Digges, who was also the first to expound the Copernican system in English and also postulated an infinite universe with infinitely many stars. Kepler also posed the problem in 1610, and the paradox took its mature form in the 18th-century work of Halley and Cheseaux. The paradox is commonly attributed to the German amateur astronomer Heinrich Wilhelm Olbers, who described it in 1823, but Harrison shows convincingly that Olbers was far from the first to pose the problem, nor was his thinking about it particularly valuable. Harrison argues that the first to set out a satisfactory resolution of the paradox was Lord Kelvin, in a little known 1901 paper, and that Edgar Allan Poe's essay Eureka (1848) curiously anticipated some qualitative aspects of Kelvin's argument:

The paradox
The paradox is that a static, infinitely old universe with an infinite number of stars distributed in an infinitely large space would be bright rather than dark.

To show this, we divide the universe into a series of concentric shells, 1 light year thick. A certain number of stars will be in the shell 1,000,000,000 to 1,000,000,001 light years away. If the universe is homogeneous at a large scale, then there would be four times as many stars in a second shell, which is between 2,000,000,000 and 2,000,000,001 light years away. However, the second shell is twice as far away, so each star in it would appear one quarter as bright as the stars in the first shell. Thus the total light received from the second shell is the same as the total light received from the first shell.

Thus each shell of a given thickness will produce the same net amount of light regardless of how far away it is. That is, the light of each shell adds to the total amount. Thus the more shells, the more light; and with infinitely many shells, there would be a bright night sky.

While dark clouds could obstruct the light, these clouds would heat up, until they were as hot as the stars, and then radiate the same amount of light.

Kepler saw this as an argument for a finite observable universe, or at least for a finite number of stars. In general relativity theory, it is still possible for the paradox to hold in a finite universe: Though the sky would not be infinitely bright, every point in the sky would still be like the surface of a star.

Explanation

The poet Edgar Allan Poe suggested that the finite size of the observable universe resolves the apparent paradox. More specifically, because the universe is finitely old and the speed of light is finite, only finitely many stars can be observed from Earth (although the whole universe can be infinite in space). The density of stars within this finite volume is sufficiently low that any line of sight from Earth is unlikely to reach a star.

However, the Big Bang theory seems to introduce a new problem: it states that the sky was much brighter in the past, especially at the end of the recombination era, when it first became transparent. All points of the local sky at that era were comparable in brightness to the surface of the Sun, due to the high temperature of the universe in that era; and most light rays will originate not from a star but the relic of the Big Bang.

This problem is addressed by the fact that the Big Bang theory also involves the expansion of space, which can cause the energy of emitted light to be reduced via redshift. More specifically, the extremely energetic radiation from the Big Bang has been redshifted to microwave wavelengths (1100 times the length of its original wavelength) as a result of the cosmic expansion, and thus forms the cosmic microwave background radiation. This explains the relatively low light densities and energy levels present in most of our sky today despite the assumed bright nature of the Big Bang. The redshift also affects light from distant stars and quasars, but this diminution is minor, since the most distant galaxies and quasars have redshifts of only around 5 to 8.6.

Other factors

Steady state
The redshift hypothesised in the Big Bang model would by itself explain the darkness of the night sky even if the universe were infinitely old. In the Steady state theory the universe is infinitely old and uniform in time as well as space. There is no Big Bang in this model, but there are stars and quasars at arbitrarily great distances. The expansion of the universe causes the light from these distant stars and quasars to redshift, so that the total light flux from the sky remains finite. Thus the observed radiation density (the sky brightness of extragalactic background light) can be independent of finiteness of the universe. Mathematically, the total electromagnetic energy density (radiation energy density) in thermodynamic equilibrium from Planck's law is

e.g. for temperature 2.7 K it is 40 fJ/m3 ... 4.5×10−31 kg/m3 and for visible temperature 6000 K we get 1 J/m3 ... 1.1×10−17 kg/m3. But the total radiation emitted by a star (or other cosmic object) is at most equal to the total nuclear binding energy of isotopes in the star. For the density of the observable universe of about 4.6×10−28 kg/m3 and given the known abundance of the chemical elements, the corresponding maximal radiation energy density of 9.2×10−31 kg/m3, i.e. temperature 3.2 K (matching the value observed for the optical radiation temperature by Arthur Eddington). This is close to the summed energy density of the cosmic microwave background (CMB) and the cosmic neutrino background. The Big Bang hypothesis predicts that the cosmic background radiation (CBR) should have the same energy density as the binding energy density of the primordial helium, which is much greater than the binding energy density of the non-primordial elements; so it gives almost the same result. However, the steady-state model does not predict the angular distribution of the microwave background temperature accurately (as the standard ΛCDM paradigm does). Nevertheless, the modified gravitation theories (without metric expansion of the universe) cannot be ruled out  by CMB and BAO observations.

Finite age of stars
Stars have a finite age and a finite power, thereby implying that each star has a finite impact on a sky's light field density. Edgar Allan Poe suggested that this idea could provide a resolution to Olbers's paradox; a related theory was also proposed by Jean-Philippe de Cheseaux. However, stars are continually being born as well as dying. As long as the density of stars throughout the universe remains constant, regardless of whether the universe itself has a finite or infinite age, there would be infinitely many other stars in the same angular direction, with an infinite total impact. So the finite age of the stars does not explain the paradox.

Brightness
Suppose that the universe were not expanding, and always had the same stellar density; then the temperature of the universe would continually increase as the stars put out more radiation. Eventually, it would reach 3000 K (corresponding to a typical photon energy of 0.3 eV and so a frequency of 7.5×1013 Hz), and the photons would begin to be absorbed by the hydrogen plasma filling most of the universe, rendering outer space opaque. So the sky is about five hundred billion times darker than it would be if the universe was neither expanding nor too young to have reached equilibrium yet. However, recent observations increasing the lower bound on the number of galaxies suggest UV absorption by hydrogen and reemission in near-IR (not visible) wavelengths also plays a role.

Fractal star distribution
A different resolution, which does not rely on the Big Bang theory, was first proposed by Carl Charlier in 1908 and later rediscovered by Benoît Mandelbrot in 1974. They both postulated that if the stars in the universe were distributed in a hierarchical fractal cosmology (e.g., similar to Cantor dust)—the average density of any region diminishes as the region considered increases—it would not be necessary to rely on the Big Bang theory to explain Olbers's paradox. This model would not rule out a Big Bang, but would allow for a dark sky even if the Big Bang had not occurred.

Mathematically, the light received from stars as a function of star distance in a hypothetical fractal cosmos is

where:

 r0 = the distance of the nearest star, r0 > 0;
 r = the variable measuring distance from the Earth;
 L(r) = average luminosity per star at distance r;
 N(r) = number of stars at distance r.

The function of luminosity from a given distance L(r)N(r) determines whether the light received is finite or infinite. For any luminosity from a given distance  proportional to ra,  is infinite for a ≥ −1 but finite for a < −1. For b = 1, the numbers of stars at a given radius is proportional to that radius. When integrated over the radius, this implies that for b = 1, the total number of stars is proportional to r2. This would correspond to a fractal dimension of 2. Thus the fractal dimension of the universe would need to be less than 2 for this explanation to work.

This explanation is not widely accepted among cosmologists, since the evidence suggests that the fractal dimension of the universe is at least 2. Moreover, the majority of cosmologists accept the cosmological principle, which assumes that matter at the scale of billions of light years is distributed isotropically. Contrarily, fractal cosmology requires anisotropic matter distribution at the largest scales.

See also 
 Heat death paradox
 List of paradoxes
 Horizon problem

References

Further reading

External links

 Relativity FAQ about Olbers's paradox
 Astronomy FAQ about Olbers's paradox
 Cosmology FAQ about Olbers's paradox
 
 Why is the sky dark? physics.org page about Olbers's paradox
 Why is it dark at night? A 60-second animation from the Perimeter Institute exploring the question with Alice and Bob in Wonderland

Physical cosmology
Physical paradoxes
Unsolved problems in astronomy